Shin River may refer to the following rivers:

Japan
Shin River (Aichi)
Shin River (Chiba)

New Zealand
Shin River (New Zealand)